American State Legislators for Gun Violence Prevention (ASLGVP) is a United States non-partisan coalition of state lawmakers to promote gun control in order to reduce gun violence. It was founded by Senator Brian P. Kavanagh (D-NY). The other legislators who joined Kavanagh at the Washington, D.C., press conference to announce the formation of the group were: Representative Barbara Bollier (R-KS); Senator José R. Rodriguez (D-TX); Representative Renny Cushing (D-NH); Representative Merika Coleman-Evans (D-AL); Representative Stacey Newman (D-MO); and Senator Adam Ebbin (D-VA).

References

Further reading

External links

2014 establishments in the United States
Organizations established in 2014
Gun control advocacy groups in the United States